The Romanian Greek Catholic Eparchy of St. George is a Romanian Greek Catholic Church ecclesiastical jurisdiction or eparchy of the Catholic Church in the United States and Canada. The incumbent eparch is John Michael Botean. The cathedral church of the eparchy is St. George's Cathedral, Canton, Ohio. There are fourteen parishes and five missions in the United States. There are two parishes in Canada.

History of the eparchy
The first Romanian Greek Catholic parish in the United States was established in 1905 by Epaminonda Lucaciu.

The eparchy was previously an apostolic exarchate which was established by Pope John Paul II in 1982 in order to formally organize the Romanian Greek Catholic parishes that had long existed in the United States under many different Latin Church dioceses.  However, in 1987, the apostolic exarchate for Romanian Greek Catholics in North America was promoted to the status of an eparchy. The eparchy is the only diocese of the Romanian Greek Catholic Church outside Romania and is directly exempt to the Holy See.

In 2005, Holy Resurrection Monastery was transferred from the Ruthenian Catholic Church to the Eparchy of St. George at the request of the monks and with the consent of the Holy See. Around the same time, Bishop John Michael blessed the canonical establishment of Holy Theophany Monastery as a monastic community of nuns.

Prelates
Vasile Louis Puscas - Apostolic Exarch (1982–1987); Eparch (1987–1993)
John Michael Botean - (since 1996)

Parish locations
Alliance, Ohio
Aurora, Illinois (2)
Boston, Massachusetts
Canton, Ohio
Chesterland, Ohio 
Chicago, Illinois
Cleveland, Ohio 
Dearborn, Michigan
Detroit, Michigan 
East Chicago, Indiana
Irvine, California
McKeesport, Pennsylvania 
New York City, New York 
Oxnard, California 
Roebling, New Jersey
Trenton, New Jersey 
Ventura, California
Montreal, Quebec
Toronto, Ontario

See also
List of the Catholic bishops of the United States#Other Eastern Catholic bishops
Catholic Church

References

External links
Romanian Catholic Eparchy of St George's in Canton Official Site
GCatholic.org information on the Eparchy

Saint George's in Canton
Saint George
Saint George's in Canton
Saint George's in Canton
Saint George's in Canton
Romanian-American history
Romanian-American culture in Ohio